Kněžice may refer to places in the Czech Republic:

Kněžice (Chrudim District), a municipality and village in the Pardubice Region]
Kněžice (Jihlava District), a municipality and village in the Vysočina Region
Kněžice (Nymburk District), a municipality and village in the Central Bohemian Region
Kněžice, a village and part of Jablonné v Podještědí in the Liberec Region
Kněžice, a village and part of Podbořany in the Ústí nad Labem Region
Kněžice, a village and part of Strážov (Klatovy District) in the Plzeň Region